Schistura dayi is a species of stone loach from the genus Schistura. It is found in small, shallow, fast flowing streams which have sandy or pebbly beds in the Indian states of Chhattisgarh, Jharkhand, Madhya Pradesh and Orissa.

References 

D
Fish described in 1935